Matt W. Windschitl (born December 30, 1983) is an American politician and businessman serving as a member of the Iowa House of Representatives from the 15th District and Majority Leader of the Iowa House.

Early life and education 
Born in 1983 in Marshalltown, Iowa, Windschitl studied gunsmithing at the Colorado School of Trades.

Career 
A Republican, he has served in the Iowa House of Representatives since 2007. Windschitl works for Doll Distributing in Council Bluffs, Iowa. Previously he has worked as a conductor for the Union Pacific Railroad and as a gunsmith.

Windschitl is a member of the United States Marine Corps Reserve and served a six-month tour in Iraq.

Windschitl was elected by his caucus to serve as House Majority Leader in 2019. Previously, he served as the Speaker Pro Tempore and served on several committees in the Iowa House: Judiciary, Local Government, Veterans Affairs, and Ways and Means committees.

References

External links 

 Representative Matt Windschitl official Iowa General Assembly site
 
 Financial information (state office) at the National Institute for Money in State Politics
 Profile at Iowa House Republicans

|-

|-

|-

|-

1983 births
21st-century American politicians
Living people
Republican Party members of the Iowa House of Representatives
People from Harrison County, Iowa
Politicians from Marshalltown, Iowa
Union Pacific Railroad people